11:11 is the second studio album by American rapper Mac Lethal. It was released on Rhymesayers Entertainment on October 9, 2007.

Critical reception
The album was described by AllMusic as "a clever, conversational rap record fueled by snarky humor and stoner cynicism." Meka Udoh of HipHopDX said, "Mac Lethal packs the album full of witty one-liners, self-deprecating humor and - as is the norm around the Rhymesayers clique - some socio-political commentary."

Track listing

Personnel
Credits adapted from liner notes.

 Mac Lethal – vocals
 Seven – production (1, 4, 5, 6, 7, 11, 12, 13)
 Lazerbeak – production (2)
 Leonard Dstroy – production (3, 8, 9, 10, 14)
 John Brewer – keyboards (9, 14)
 DJ Sku – turntables
 Justin Mantooth – recording, mixing
 MK Larada – art direction, design, illustration, photography
 Jay Soldner – photography

Charts

References

Further reading

External links
 
 

2007 albums
Mac Lethal albums
Rhymesayers Entertainment albums
Albums produced by Seven (record producer)
Albums produced by Lazerbeak